Pentago is a two-player abstract strategy game invented by Tomas Flodén.

The game is played on a 6×6 board divided into four 3×3 sub-boards (or quadrants). Taking turns, the two players place a marble of their color (either black or white) onto an unoccupied space on the board, and then rotate one of the sub-boards by 90 degrees either clockwise or anti-clockwise. This is optional at the beginning of the game, up until every sub-board no longer has rotational symmetry, at which point it becomes mandatory (this is because until then, a player could rotate an empty sub-board or one with just a marble in the middle, either of which has no real effect). A player wins by getting five of their marbles in a vertical, horizontal, or diagonal row (either before or after the sub-board rotation in their move). If all 36 spaces on the board are occupied without a row of five being formed then the game is a draw.

There is also a 3-4 player version called Pentago XL. The board is made of 9 3×3 boards, and there are 4 colours (red, yellow, green and blue) instead of the basic 2.

MindtwisterUSA has the rights of developing and commercializing the product in North America.

The 6×6 version of Pentago has been strongly solved with the help of a Cray supercomputer at NERSC. With symmetries removed, there are 3,009,081,623,421,558 possible positions. If both sides play perfectly, the first player to move will always win the game.

Awards
 Game of the Year 2005 in Sweden
 Game of the Year 2006 in France
 Award winner in Mensa Mind Games 2006  Review
So far Pentago has won 8 major awards, lastly Game of the Year 2007, by Creative Child Magazine.

References

External links
 Perfect play explorer online

Board games introduced in 2005
Abstract strategy games
Mensa Select winners
Solved games